The Ministry of Infrastructure and Sustainable Energy (MISE) is a government ministry of Kiribati, as ministry of infrastructure and as ministry of energy, headquartered in South Tarawa.

Ministers
Ruateki Tekaiara (2016–2020)
Willie Tokataake (2020–)

References

External link
MISE

Energy ministries
Infrastructure ministries
Government of Kiribati